Forrest Schwengels (August 27, 1915 – April 10, 1989) was an American politician who served in the Iowa Senate from 1973 to 1989. He was the brother of Fred Schwengel.

References

1915 births
1989 deaths
Republican Party Iowa state senators
20th-century American politicians
American people of German descent